The Macau Resident Identity Card or BIR is an official identity card issued by the Identification  Services  Bureau of Macau. There are two types of Resident Identity Cards: one for permanent residents and one for non-permanent residents.

Macau Permanent Resident Identity Card

The Macau resident (permanent) ID card, is for permanent residents of Macau, and is also valid for travel to the Hong Kong Special Administrative Region, as long as the visit is no longer than 180 days and for business, transit or leisure. The current generation of contactless electronic identity card were first issued in 2013, replacing the first generation contact-based electronic identity card issued from 2002. The cards replace the old Bilhete de Identidade Cidadão Estrangeiro (BICE).

Eligibility
Holder of the Certificate of Entitlement to the Right of abode in the Macau SAR, or
Born in Macau and one of the applicant's legal ascendant(s) was a Macau resident at the time of birth

Macau Non-Permanent Resident Identity Card

The Macau resident (non-permanent) ID card, is for non-permanent residents of Macau.

Eligibility
Holder of One-way Exit Permit of the People's Republic of China, 
Holder of a Certificado de Residência issued by the police in Macau, or
Holders of Residence Permit "Guia de Autorização de Residência"

Application

New applications for a BIR require a valid birth certificate; photocopies of legal ascendant(s) identification documents; and, if in possession of a Hong Kong Identity Card, a photocopy of the card; and a recent photograph (or can choose to have on taken at time of application.) Applicants are required to provide documentation to prove marital status, i.e. marriage certificate, divorce certificate, etc. Other documents may also be required depending on the applicants status in Macau and mainland China.

To renew the BIR, the old BIR, photograph and documentation to prove any change in status (marital, resident, personal information) is required. There is an additional fee if the original BIR can not be presented at time of application for renewal.

Description

Information on the face of the card

 embedded chip
 Digital photograph
 Surname, Given Name (in Chinese, Chinese telegraph code, and Portuguese)
 Date of Birth (DD-MM-YYYY)
 Date of Issue (DD-MM-YYYY)
 Validity Date (DD-MM-YYYY) - expiry date
 Date of First Issue (DD-MM-YYYY)
 Signature
 ID number (8 digit numeric: XXXXXXX(X))
 Multiple laser image of photo, ID number, sex and date of birth)
 Code for place of birth and sex
 Height (metres)

Information on the rear of the card

 Name of type of card ("Permanent Resident Identity Card" or "Non-Permanent Resident Identity Card") in Chinese and Portuguese
 Reference to legal references on the issuance of this card
 Machine-readable zone (OCR lines)
 Seal of the Government of Macau

Use as a travel document

Holders of a Macau Permanent Resident Identity Card enjoy permit-free entry to visit Hong Kong for up to 180 days. This does not apply to holders of Non-Permanent Resident Identity Cards, but such non-permanent residents may be eligible to apply for a Visit Permit for Residents of Macao to HKSAR, which grants holders permit-free entry to visit Hong Kong for up to 30 days.

See also

 Macao Special Administrative Region passport
 Macao Special Administrative Region Travel Permit
 Visit Permit for Residents of Macao to HKSAR
 Politics of Macau
 Wealth Partaking Scheme 
 Hong Kong Identity Card
 Resident Identity Card used in the People's Republic of China

References

External links
 Application of Macao SAR Resident Identity Card (BIR) - Direcção dos Serviços de Identificação
 Certificate of Entitlement to the Right of Abode in the Macau - Direcção dos Serviços de Identificação

Government of Macau
Macau law
Macau